The 1977 Charlotte Tennis Classic, also known by its sponsored name North Carolina National Bank Tennis Classic,  was a men's tennis tournament played on outdoor clay courts that was part of the World Championship Tennis (WCT) circuit. It was the seventh edition of the tournament and was held from April 18 through April 24, 1977 at the Julian J. Clark Tennis Stadium, owned by the Olde Providence Racquet Club in Charlotte, North Carolina in the United States. Unseeded Corrado Barazzutti won the singles title and earned $30,000 first-prize money.

Finals

Singles
 Corrado Barazzutti defeated  Eddie Dibbs 7–6, 6–0
 It was Barazzutti's 1st title of the year and the 2nd of his career.

Doubles
 Tom Okker /  Ken Rosewall defeated  Corrado Barazzutti /  Adriano Panatta 6–1, 3–6, 7–6

References

External links
 ITF tournament edition details

Charlotte Tennis Classic
Charlotte Tennis Classic
Charlotte Tennis Classic
Charlotte Tennis Classic